Trenhorne is a hamlet in the parish of Lewannick, Cornwall, England, United Kingdom.

References

Hamlets in Cornwall